Sky mountain can refer to:
 Sky Mountain, near Sedona, Arizona, USA.
 Tian Shan in Central Asia
 Himmelbjerget in Denmark